Scroop Egerton, 1st Duke of Bridgewater (11 August 1681 – 11 January 1744), known as Viscount Brackley from 1687 to 1701 and as the 4th Earl of Bridgewater from 1701 to 1720, was a British peer, courtier and pioneering landowner.

Born of the Egerton family, he succeeded as 4th Earl of Bridgewater in 1701, before being created Duke of Bridgewater on 18 June 1720, with subsidiary titles including Marquess of Brackley.

Early life
Scroop Egerton was born on 11 August 1681, the third son of John Egerton, 3rd Earl of Bridgewater, and his second wife, Lady Jane Paulet. His maternal grandparents were Charles Paulet, 1st Duke of Bolton, and his second wife, Mary Scrope, natural daughter of Emanuel Scrope, 1st Earl of Sunderland.

Scroop Egerton is recorded as being educated at the Whitgift School, Croydon.

Career
Bridgewater, a Whig, served twice as Lord Lieutenant of Buckinghamshire, first from 1702 to 1711 (during the reign of Queen Anne) and later again from 1714 to 1728 (the reigns of George I and George II). 

Bridgewater first saw royal service when appointed to the household of Prince George of Denmark as Gentleman of the Bedchamber and Master of the Horse.  Later, he served as Lord Chamberlain to Caroline, Princess of Wales, and subsequently as Lord of the Bedchamber to her husband, who had by then acceded to the throne as King George II.

Scroop Egerton commissioned the building of Brackley's new Town Hall in 1704, and it was completed in 1706. He was the lord of the manor, and also Lord Lieutenant of Buckinghamshire at this time.

Family life

On 9 February 1703, Bridgewater married his first wife, Lady Elizabeth, daughter of John Churchill, 1st Duke of Marlborough, and the former Sarah Jenyns. The couple had two children:
 John Egerton, Viscount Brackley (b. 1703/4, d. 1718/9) died at age 14 at Eton College, Windsor, Berkshire, England. He was buried on 5 February 1718/19 at Little Gaddesden, Hertfordshire, England. He was styled as Viscount Brackley between 1704 and 1719.
 Lady Anne Egerton (d. 1762); married first Wriothesley Russell, 3rd Duke of Bedford, and, secondly William Villiers, 3rd Earl of Jersey.

The Countess of Bridgewater died on 22 March 1714. About eight years later, on 4 August 1722, Bridgewater married his second wife, Lady Rachael, daughter of Wriothesley Russell, 2nd Duke of Bedford, and Elizabeth née Howland. The couple had seven children:

 Lady Louisa Egerton (30 April 1723 –14 March 1761); married Granville Leveson-Gower, 1st Marquess of Stafford.
 Lady Caroline Egerton (b. 21 May 1724).
 Charles Egerton, Marquess of Brackley (27 July 1725 –2 May 1731).
 John Egerton, 2nd Duke of Bridgewater (29 April 1727 –26 February 1748). 
 Lord William Egerton (15 January 1728 –10 February 1729).
 Lady Diana Egerton (3 March 1731/2 –13 August 1758); married Frederick Calvert, 6th Baron Baltimore on 9 March 1753. The union was not a success, and the couple spent most of their married life apart. They had no children, and in May 1756 they were formally separated, due to an "incompatibility of temper". In 1758, Lady Diana "died from a hurt she received by a fall out of a Phaethon carriage", while accompanied by her husband. Although Lord Baltimore was suspected of foul play, no charges were ever brought.
 Francis Egerton, 3rd Duke of Bridgewater (21 May 1736 –8 March 1803).

See also 
 Egerton family
 Manchester Coalfield
 Peerage of Great Britain

References

Bibliography

External links

www.thePeerage.com
www.ashridgehouse.org.uk

 

1681 births
1744 deaths
18th-century English nobility
People educated at Whitgift School
Scroop
English landowners
101
Lord-Lieutenants of Buckinghamshire